Terry Lee Jones (born February 15, 1971) is an American retired professional baseball player who played outfielder in Major League Baseball (MLB) from 1996 to 2001. He played college baseball at the University of North Alabama in 1993. He led the Gulf South Conference in stolen bases that year.

External links

1971 births
Living people
African-American baseball players
American expatriate baseball players in Canada
Baseball players from Birmingham, Alabama
Bend Rockies players
Central Valley Rockies players
Colorado Rockies players
Colorado Springs Sky Sox players
Duluth-Superior Dukes players
Jupiter Hammerheads players
Major League Baseball outfielders
Montreal Expos players
New Haven Ravens players
North Alabama Lions baseball players
Ottawa Lynx players
21st-century African-American sportspeople
20th-century African-American sportspeople